Béla Kontuly (1904 in Miskolc – 1983 in Budapest) was a Hungarian painter and art teacher.

References

External links
Béla Kontuly on artportal

1904 births
1983 deaths
People from Miskolc
20th-century Hungarian painters
Hungarian male painters
20th-century Hungarian male artists